Rush Peak is a mountain in the Karakoram mountain range of Central Asia. It is located in the Nagar District of Gilgit-Baltistan, Pakistan. While not a high peak by local standards, it is noteworthy as a remote trekking destination. It can be reached via Nagar Valley and Hoper Village. The peak can be accessed via Hoper Glacier (Bualtar Glacier) and Barpu Glacier. The peak is relatively easy to climb in the summer months and ascents have been made by amateur climbers without proper mountaineering gear. In winter, access to the mountain is made difficult by heavy snows. The top of the peak provides views of Miar Peak (6,824 m), Miar Glacier and Phuparash Peak (6,574 m). On a clear day, one can look east and see some of the world's highest mountains, including K2 and Broad Peak. At the mountain's base lies one of the world's highest alpine lakes, Rush Lake (4,694m).

See also
 Rush Lake
 List of mountains in Pakistan

References

External links
 Northern Pakistan detailed placemarks in Google Earth

Mountains of Gilgit-Baltistan
Five-thousanders of the Karakoram